The Joy Luck Club is a 1993 American drama film about the relationships between Chinese-American women and their Chinese immigrant mothers. It was directed by Wayne Wang and stars Tsai Chin, Kieu Chinh, Lisa Lu, France Nuyen, Rosalind Chao, Lauren Tom, Tamlyn Tomita, and Ming-Na Wen. The film is based on the 1989 novel of the same name by Amy Tan, who co-wrote the screenplay with Ronald Bass. The film was produced by Bass, Tan, Wang, and Patrick Markey, while Oliver Stone served as an executive producer. Four older women, all Chinese immigrants living in San Francisco, meet regularly to play mahjong, eat, and tell stories. Each of these women has an adult Chinese-American daughter. The film reveals the hidden pasts of the older women and their daughters, and how their lives are shaped by the clash of Chinese and American cultures as they strive to understand their family bonds and one another.

Development of the project began when Wang approached Tan in 1989 at the time of the novel's release. Concerned about the novel's complex storytelling and character development, they teamed up with Bass in January 1990, who added a farewell party not in the original novel and voice-overs to compress the film's storytelling without changing the main plot. Carolco Pictures initially supported the project until 1990, when the filmmakers turned down the contract for not receiving the creative control that they demanded. After the first draft was written between August and November 1991, the filmmakers shifted to Hollywood Pictures in spring 1992. Principal photography took place in San Francisco, the novel and the film's main setting, in October 1992 and then in China in February 1993. Filming ended in March 1993.

The film was privately screened in sneak previews in spring 1993 and film festivals in August and September 1993. It premiered in Los Angeles, New York City, and San Francisco on September 8, 1993. With the film's $10.5 million budget, it was moderately successful in the box office, earning $32.9 million in the United States. It received positive critical reaction, but also criticism for its negative portrayal of Asian-American and Asian male characters.

In 2020, the film was selected for preservation in the United States National Film Registry by the Library of Congress as being "culturally, historically, or aesthetically significant".

Plot

The Joy Luck Club was formed by four women in San Francisco: Lindo Jong, Ying-Ying St. Clair, An-Mei Hsu, and Suyuan Woo. The members have mainly played mahjong and told each other stories over the years. They emigrated from China, their native country, remarried, and gave birth to children in America. Suyuan's daughter, June, replaced her when Suyuan died four months before the time the film is set. The mothers have high hopes for their daughters' successes, but the daughters struggle through "anxieties, feelings of inadequacy, and failures." Throughout the film, the mothers and daughters bond by learning to understand each other and by overcoming their conflicts.

Prologue
In the prologue tale, narrated by June, a woman bought a swan in China from a market vendor who was selling it as "a duck that stretched its neck [to become] a goose." She kept it as her pet and brought it to the United States. When the immigration officials took it away from her, she struggled to grab the swan away, but was only able to retrieve one feather. For a long time, the woman had kept the feather, planning to give it to her daughter someday.

Then the film transitions to June's farewell surprise party in San Francisco for her upcoming reunion with her long-lost twin sisters in China. Among the guests are members of the Joy Luck Club, their daughters, other relatives, and friends. The characters below narrate their journeys to the audience while they reflect upon their pasts.

Lindo and Waverly Jong
In China, four-year-old Lindo is betrothed to Tyan Yu, the son of the wealthy Huang family, and at 15 moves into the Huang household. She spends the next four years in a childless and loveless marriage, earning the ire of her mother-in-law for failing to bear a son.

Lindo overhears a servant girl telling her lover that she is pregnant, prompting him to abandon her. Plotting to leave the marriage without dishonoring herself, her family, and her in-laws, Lindo pretends to have a nightmare in which Tyan Yu's ancestor expresses his displeasure at the marriage. She also claims that the ancestor has impregnated the servant girl with Tyan Yu's child, and that the matchmaker who arranged the marriage intentionally and wrongly paired Lindo and Tyan Yu for money. Furious, Mrs. Huang orders the matchmakers out of the Huangs' lives, allows the servant girl to marry Tyan Yu, and eventually gets the grandson she has desired. Lindo finally leaves the house and then moves to Shanghai.

Years later, in America, Lindo has a new husband, a son, and a daughter named Waverly. At six years old, Waverly develops an interest in chess and becomes a chess champion. Annoyed by Lindo's constant boasting about Waverly's accomplishments, Waverly decides to quit chess. When she tries to play it again, Waverly finds that she has lost her confidence, prompting her to retire.

Waverly, now an adult, has a daughter from her Chinese ex-husband and is engaged to a white man, Rich, much to Lindo's chagrin. Waverly brings Rich to a family dinner in the hopes that Lindo will like him, but he improperly uses chopsticks and inadvertently insults Lindo's cooking, humiliating Waverly.

Some time later, Lindo and Waverly go to a hair salon to get their hair done for Waverly's upcoming wedding. When Waverly directs the stylist on how to style Lindo's hair, Lindo is offended that her daughter would be embarrassed by her and becomes reluctant to attend the wedding. Lindo then tells her about one of her moments with her own mother. When Waverly asks whether Lindo likes Rich, Lindo admits that she likes Rich very much and gives Waverly and Rich her blessings, leading Waverly and her to reconcile. Back at June's farewell party, Rich almost successfully uses chopsticks (but accidentally drops a piece) and impresses Lindo by trying to respect Chinese table manners.

Ying-Ying and Lena St. Clair
In China, Ying-Ying St. Clair is married to Lin-Xiao, who turns out to be abusive and unfaithful. Overwhelmed by her depression, Ying-Ying begins to dissociate and drowns their baby son in the bathtub, which haunts her afterward. Years later, she has emigrated from America and suffers from bouts of depression from the trauma, as well as worrying that her daughter Lena will also suffer.

After Ying-Ying finally resolves her years of trauma, Lena shows Ying-Ying around the new apartment she shares with her husband Harold, who is also Lena's boss. Ying-Ying learns that Lena is uncomfortable with her financial arrangements with Harold. They split the costs of their life evenly with a list of things that they share, making their home life contentious. However, Harold dominates the arrangements and ignores most of Lena's needs.

Seeing that Lena is unhappy with her marriage, Ying-Ying reasserts herself by knocking over a table in the bedroom and causing a vase to fall from the table and break. Hearing the sudden noise, Lena goes to her mother and admits her unhappiness. Ying-Ying tells Lena she should leave and not come back until Harold gives her what she wants. Shifting to June's farewell party, Lena is seen in a fulfilling relationship with her new fiancé Ken, who is accepting of Ying-Ying, as she is of him.

An-Mei and Rose Hsu
Nine-year-old An-Mei Hsu has been raised by her relatives and grandmother. She is reunited with her long-lost mother, who was disowned by her family for becoming the Fourth Wife of a wealthy middle-aged man named Wu-Tsing shortly after her husband's death, and has returned to the household to care for her dying mother. To not be separated from her again, An-Mei moves out with her mother to Wu-Tsing's house against her relatives' wishes.

Years later, in America, An-Mei's daughter, Rose, meets her future husband, Ted Jordan, in college. Ted is initially attracted to Rose's assertive, forthright nature. She agrees to marry him when he confronts his snobbish mother for making racist comments towards her. Over the course of their marriage, Rose and Ted grow apart, mainly because Rose, desperate to fit in with Ted's associates, becomes submissive and demure at the cost of her own identity and interests. To complicate matters more, Rose suspects that Ted has cheated on her with another woman, which he asserts is not the main reason for their problems.

Some time later, An-Mei comes for a visit and relays the story of her own mother's fate to Rose. When An-Mei arrives at Wu-Tsing's house, the Second Wife gives An-Mei a pearl necklace as a gift. Dismayed that her daughter has been so easily won over, An-Mei's mother breaks the necklace, revealing it to be made of glass. Later, An-Mei learns the truth of how her mother became a Fourth Wife: While her mother was at the temple mourning the death of her husband, the Second Wife met and befriended her, enticing her to meet Wu-Tsing, who raped and impregnated her. The mother's relatives refused to believe she had been raped and kicked her out of the house. With nowhere else to go, the mother reluctantly agreed to become Wu-Tsing's Fourth Wife. After her mother gave birth to a boy, An-Mei's half brother, the Second Wife claimed him as her own. After telling An-Mei the truth about her situation, the mother commits suicide by eating "sticky sweet dumplings" laced with opium, choosing the day of her death carefully to threaten Wu-Tsing with the vengeance of her angry ghost. Afraid of this curse, Wu-Tsing vows to honor An-Mei's mother as an honorable First Wife and promises to raise An-Mei and her half brother accordingly. When the Second Wife tries to pay respects to An-Mei's late mother, An-Mei screams at the Second Wife, and destroys her necklace. As An-Mei narrates, the Second Wife's hair starts turning white after that day.

In the present day, An-Mei encourages Rose to stand up to Ted for herself and their daughter Jennifer, or nothing will change. To avoid the fate of An-Mei's mother, Rose reclaims her strength and confronts Ted, telling him that he will leave the house and that he will not take their daughter away from her. Rose then tells him that she was wrong to consider her love for him as less worthy than his love for her, compelling Ted to take her seriously and stop taking her for granted. At June's farewell party, Rose and Ted are seen together, the state of their marriage seemingly much improved.

Suyuan and June Woo
During the Japanese invasion of China in World War II, Suyuan Woo escapes with her twin baby daughters, but becomes ill and her cart breaks down during the journey. Near death, Suyuan is unable to carry the babies herself and abandons them, along with all of her other possessions, including a photo of herself. Suyuan survives, but is haunted by guilt over the loss of her daughters and not knowing their fates.

After remarrying in America, Suyuan has high hopes for her new daughter, June, who feels that she can never be more than who she is, so fails to live up to her mother's expectations. Suyuan insists that June learn piano in the hopes that she will turn out to be a prodigy, but she quits after performing poorly in a recital.

The story moves ahead to one year before Suyuan's passing. June, now an adult, has been freelancing for her long-time friend and rival, Waverly. At a dinner party, Waverly rejects June's business proposals, prompting Suyuan to comment on the differences between June and Waverly, saying that style is something one cannot be taught, but must be born with. June feels humiliated at the implication that Waverly has style, and she does not, believing that her mother has betrayed her, being a failure in her mother's eyes.

The following day, June berates Suyuan for her remarks and admits she could never live up to her high expectations. June laments that Suyuan has always been disappointed in June because of her disappointing academic grades, her lack of a serious relationship, and her less-than-successful job. Suyuan gives her a necklace that she has worn since June's birth, telling June that it will guide June's heart as it has done hers. Suyuan also assures June that she is the one who has the unteachable style, admitting that while Waverly has been the better of the two in competitions, June always has had the best heart, which is the reason Suyuan is so proud to have June as her daughter.

On Easter, before her farewell party, June receives the news from the club that her long-lost twin sisters are alive. When June cannot understand the twins' letter written in Chinese, Lindo purposely mistranslates the letter, claiming that the twins are aware of Suyuan's death and the existence of their half sister June. Back in the present, when the farewell party ends, Lindo confesses that she wrote letters to the twins and then signed Suyuan's name. June begs Lindo to tell them the truth, but Lindo tells her that it is too late, because the twin sisters are anticipating their mother, still believing that Suyuan is alive, and that June must be the one to inform them of their mother's death. A short while later, June's father retells the war story of Suyuan and her long-lost twin daughters. Then he gives her the swan feather (as described earlier in the prologue) from Suyuan's swan, saying that the feather looks worthless, but carries with it all of her mother's "good intentions". When she arrives in China to meet her sisters, June tells them the truth about Suyuan and herself. The sisters finally embrace.

Cast

Mothers
 Kieu Chinh as Suyuan Woo
 Tsai Chin as Lindo Jong
 Age 4: Ying Wu
 Age 15: Irene Ng
 France Nuyen as Ying-Ying St. Clair
 Age 16–25: Faye Yu
 Lisa Lu as An-Mei Hsu
 Age 4: Emmy Yu
 Age 9: Yi Ding

Daughters
 Ming-Na Wen as June Woo
 Age 9: Melanie Chang
 Tamlyn Tomita as Waverly Jong
 Age 6–9: Mai Vu
 Lauren Tom as Lena St. Clair
 Rosalind Chao as Rose Hsu Jordan

Other characters
 Michael Paul Chan as Harold, Lena's Husband
 Andrew McCarthy as Ted Jordan
 Christopher Rich as Rich
 Russell Wong as Lin Xiao
 Vivian Wu as An-Mei's Mother
 Victor Wong as Old Chong the Piano Teacher
 Xi Meijuan as Lindo's Mother
 Hsu Ying Li as the matchmaker
 Diane Baker as Mrs. Jordan
 Wu Tianming as Wu-Tsing
 Elizabeth Sung as Second Wife
 Chao-Li Chi as June's Father
 Philip Moon as Ken, Lena's Fiancé

Production

Amy Tan and Academy Award-winner Ronald Bass wrote the film adaptation. Wayne Wang, who made prior films about Chinese Americans, such as his first film, Chan Is Missing, was the director. Wang, Tan, Bass, and Patrick Markey were the producers. Oliver Stone and Janet Yang were the executive producers. The production designer was Don Burt. Maysie Hoy was the film editor.

When the novel, The Joy Luck Club, was released in 1989, Wayne Wang approached Amy Tan, the novel's author, with the idea of adapting the novel that he admired into a film. Wang and Tan grew concerned about transforming it into a film, and Wang was almost reluctant to make another film about Chinese Americans since Eat a Bowl of Tea because Wang's prior films had not attracted wide audiences. No Hollywood movies were known to have an all-Asian cast at the time, and making a film with Chinese protagonists was risky especially because Asian actors were not well known to American audiences. Ronald Bass, whom Wang and Tan teamed up with since their meeting at the Hotel Bel-Air in January 1990, analyzed the novel and outlined how to bring it to the screen, with "no single lead character." Because many studios found the novel's "characters and plot [...] too internal and complex" to adapt into a film, Bass added two additional changes without changing the main plot: June Woo's farewell party as the film's timeline setting and the first-person narration in addition to voice-overs to compress the film's storytelling.

Wayne Wang, Amy Tan, and Ronald Bass teamed up with the Ixtlan Corporation, including its staff members, Oliver Stone and Janet Yang, who was the company's vice president and had a profound interest in the project. Before the project, Stone and Wang disagreed with each other about their own portrayals of Chinese people. Wang gave Stone's thriller Year of the Dragon a negative review for portraying Chinese characters as "[mobsters], gangsters, and prostitutes." Stone responded by calling Wang's Dim Sum: A Little Bit of Heart "boring" for its lack of action. Stone and Wang reconciled their differences,  enabling them to work together and finally agreed to produce the film together, along with other producers.

Carolco Pictures initially agreed to support the project in spring 1990, but the company had fiscal problems, and the filmmakers turned down the contract in fall 1990 due to not receiving the level of creative control that they demanded. Therefore, Tan, Wang, and Bass outlined the screenplay themselves "in a narrative format" over three days in January 1991. Tan and Bass completed the first draft between August and November 1991. When they returned to Ixtlan in March 1992, Jeffrey Katzenberg, chairman of Walt Disney Studios, approved the project as proposed by Stone and Yang, and gave them full creative control. In spring 1992, Hollywood Pictures agreed to assist production and distribute the film.

Despite that she lacked filmmaking experience, "[Amy] Tan found the process not nearly as bad as she had feared. She was happy that collaborating meant discussions and that they were followed by time to write on her own." Janet Yang said that although several studios were interested, Disney "was the only one to step up to the line". The producers were surprised, but Yang felt in retrospect that Joy Luck "fits in with Disney's agenda—taking a chance on low-budget projects not dependent on star power". She described Disney as being "less hands-on than usual" through not being familiar with the subject.

In regard to casting, director Wang filled 50 speaking parts for female characters and 10 parts for male characters. He had to find Asian actresses who were visually distinct despite the lack of variation in hair color and ethnic features, and additionally he had to find actresses of different ages similar in appearance to younger or older selves as different parts of the film occur in different time periods. Additionally, he wanted to use several actresses and actors who spoke Mandarin, so this aspect limited casting options. A total of 15 actresses portrayed the main characters, with the main group consisting of eight.

Filming began in San Francisco in October 1992 and then in China in February 1993. Amy Tan did not participate in the casting, though Tan's mother, aunts, and four-year-old niece were extras in the movie, as well as Janet Yang's parents and Tan herself briefly. The filming was completed in March 1993. The film's budget totaled to $10.5–10.6 million.

Hsu Ying Li (1910–1993), who portrayed the matchmaker in the film, and worked as a culture consultant on set, was killed in a car accident in Oakland, California, on April 28, 1993. Therefore, the film is dedicated in her memory in the end credits.

Reception

Audience and critical response
Reviews of The Joy Luck Club were generally positive. The film holds an 86% rating on Rotten Tomatoes based on 83 reviews, including 71 "fresh" ones. The site's consensus states: "The Joy Luck Club traces the generational divide, unearthing universal truths while exploring lives through the lens of a specific cultural experience." CinemaScore reported that audiences gave the film an "A+" grade. Critic Gene Siskel, singled out the script and performances, praising the film for presenting images of Asian Americans outside the narrow range of childhood violinists and spelling-bee winners, opining that its main accomplishments were its depiction of how the brutality of the lives of women in China could continue to influence the lives of their American daughters, and its ability to allow audiences to relate to a large group of Chinese Americans as individuals. Siskel picked it as the seventh of the top ten movies of 1993, while Roger Ebert picked it as the fifth of his own top 10 movies of 1993.

It was voted one of the favorite films of 1993 among 1,297 readers of The Arizona Daily Star, ranked number 14 out of 253. However, when the film premiered in the United Kingdom, "some British critics found it more schmaltzy than sour-sweet." It was one of 400 nominated movies as of 1998 to be listed as part  AFI's 100 Years...100 Movies, but it failed to be listed in both the 1998 list and the 2007 list.

Ty Burr from Entertainment Weekly graded it a C+ and wrote that the film "covers primal issues of abandonment, infanticide, motherly love, and self-respect, pounds you with pathos[, and] is extremely faithful to the novel". Burr found the story "exhausting" and preachy, he criticized the "cringingly bald, full of self-help blather" dialogue, and deemed male characters as "perfidies". However, he found the acting "generous [and] intelligent", and picked the segment of Rosalind Chao and Lisa Lu as "the only one that feels genuinely cinematic [yet] too late to save the movie".

David Denby from The New Yorker called the film "a superb achievement" and praised the director's "impressive visual skills". However, Denby criticized the film  writing, "[I]ts tone is relentlessly earnest, its meanings limited or wanly inspirational, and my emotions, rather than well[ed] up, remained small." Moreover, he deemed men in the film as "caricatures" and the mothers' attempts to "teach [their daughters] the lesson of self-worth" as inadequate and pretentious.

Film critic Emanuel Levy graded the film a B+, calling it an "emotionally heart-rending study of generational gap–but also continuity–between Chinese mothers and their Chinese-American daughters" and a visually well-done propaganda for "cultural diversity". However, he also found it too long with "too many stories and […] flashbacks" and too mainstream and broad to be an art film, especially when it was screened in "prestigious film festivals." Matt Hinrichs from DVD Talk rated the film four and a half stars out of five, commenting, "Despite the cultural and gender-specific nature of the story, […] there are a lot of overriding themes explored here (such as the daughters fearing that they're repeating their moms' mistakes) that have a universal scope and appeal."

Harvard Crimson writer, Allen Soong, reflected that "while the women in this film are fully fleshed-out characters who are a remarkable improvement over the "exotic Oriental" Cassandra from Wayne's World, the male characters are merely additions to the long list of negative images of Asian men in our culture." He added that "the Asian men in The Joy Luck Club, ... are either domineering and misogynist in the worst imaginable way, or they're just clueless and aloof."

Prerelease and box office
In April 1993, Amy Tan watched the rough cut of The Joy Luck Club and praised it as an emotional tearjerker. It was thereafter screened to a bigger audience in mid-May, to an even broader audience a few weeks later, to the Asian American Journalists Association on the week of August 16, at the Telluride Film Festival on the Labor Day weekend, and at the Toronto International Film Festival in mid-September. The film opened to theatres at limited release in Los Angeles, New York City, and San Francisco on September 8, 1993. It slowly expanded to several hundred theatres by October 1 nationwide, including Salt Lake City, Utah, and St. Petersburg, Florida. It opened in some other cities on October 8, like Austin, Texas. The film earned nearly $33 million in the United States.

Awards and nominations

Music
The soundtrack was released by Hollywood Records on September 28, 1993. It was composed and produced by Rachel Portman, co-orchestrated by Portman and John Neufeld, conducted by J. A. C. Redford. Chinese instruments were used as well as Western music. Filmtracks website and Jason Ankeny from Allmusic gave the soundtrack four stars out of five. Filmtracks found the music cues not as "outstanding" as Portman's "other singular achievements in her career" but the website noted that the whole album "never becomes too repetitive to enjoy[,]" even when the music cues lack diversity from each other. The first 14 tracks were composed by Rachel Portman. The 15th and final track, "End Titles", was composed by David Arnold, Marvin Hamlisch, and Rachel Portman. The album duration is around 44 minutes.

Legacy and possible sequel
At the time the film was released, it was anticipated that Hollywood would begin to develop more films around the Asian experience, but this did not eventually happen. Flower Drum Song, released in 1961, was the first film to feature a majority Asian cast telling a contemporary Asian-American story. The Joy Luck Club (1993) was the second, a third of a century later, the third was released a quarter-century later in 2018, Crazy Rich Asians, and the most recent three years later with the Marvel superhero film Shang-Chi and the Legend of the Ten Rings.

In the 1990s, after the success of the film, Disney Studios contacted Amy Tan to discuss making her second novel, The Kitchen God's Wife, into a film, a spiritual successor/sequel to the first; however, negotiations fell through. In the waning of the glow of The Joy Luck Club, further Asian American stories were mostly shot down by studios after the brief rush following the film.

In 2018, Ronald Bass, the producer of the film, revealed that a sequel is in the works, waiting to be picked up by a studio or a network. Both a TV series pilot script and a sequel feature film script have been made. The intention is to reunite the original cast for the sequel, making the film's mothers into grandmothers and daughters into mothers, with Millennial children, in a three-generation story, following the developments of the families since the original film. The setting would be 25-years after the setting of the film. In 2022, it was announced that the sequel was now in the works, and would be produced by Hyde Park Entertainment Group and producer Jeff Kleeman.

In 2020, the film was selected for preservation in the United States National Film Registry by the Library of Congress as being "culturally, historically, or aesthetically significant".

Notes

References
 
  For paperback: .

Further reading

External links
 
 
 
 
 
 

1993 films
Films about Chinese Americans
1990s feminist films
Films based on American novels
Films directed by Wayne Wang
Films scored by Rachel Portman
Films set in China
Films set in San Francisco
Films shot in China
Films shot in San Francisco
Films set in the San Francisco Bay Area
Hollywood Pictures films
Films about interracial romance
Films with screenplays by Ronald Bass
Adultery in films
Asian-American drama films
American drama films
Amy Tan
1993 romantic drama films
Chinatown, San Francisco in fiction
1990s female buddy films
Films about mother–daughter relationships
United States National Film Registry films
Chinese-language American films
1990s American films